Ivano-Frankivsk Oblast Football Federation (IFFF) is a football governing body in the region of Ivano-Frankivsk Oblast, Ukraine. The federation is a member of the Regional Council of FFU and the collective member of the FFU itself.

History
The federation was established on January 23, 1991, although is listed on the official web-site of the Football Federation of Ukraine as of February 29, 1992. Previously during the World War II, local teams participated in championship of Galicia (Halychyna) that was conducted by both Soviet and Nazi authorities, while in 1934-39 it was part of the Polish football as the Stanislawow District of the Polish Football Association.

Presidents
 1990 – 1998 Taras Klym
 1998 – 2006 Zinoviy Shkutiak
 2006 – 2013 Viktor Anushkevichius
 2013 – 2017 Taras Klym
 2017 –  Andriy Bondarenko

Previous Champions

1945    FC Blyskavka Kolomyia
1946    FC Spartak Stanislav
1947    FC Kalush 
1948    FC Dynamo Stanislav
1949    FC Spartak Stanislav (2)
1950    DTSRM Stanislav
1951    FC Spartak Stanislav (3)
1952    FC Khimik Kalush (2)
1953    FC Spartak Stanislav (4)
1954    FC Iskra Kolomyia
1955    FC Khimik Kalush (3)
1956    FC Burevisnyk Kolomyia
1957    FC Khimik Kalush (4)
1958    FC Khimik Kalush (5)
1959    FC Khimik Kalush (6)
1960    FC Khimik Kalush (7)
1961    FC Khimik Kalush (8)
1962    AC Osmoloda Perehinske
1963    FC Naftovyk Nadvirna
1964    FC Naftovyk Dolyna
1965    FC Naftovyk Nadvirna (2)
1966    FC Khimik Kalush (9)
1967    FC Khimik Kalush (10)
1968    FC Karpaty Kolomyia
1969    FC Khimik Kalush (11)
1970    FC Budivelnyk Kalush
1971    FC Prylad Ivano-Frankivsk
1972    FC Elektron Ivano-Frankivsk
1973    FC Elektron Ivano-Frankivsk (2)
1974    FC Elektron Ivano-Frankivsk (3)
1975    FC Khimik Kalush (12)
1976    FC Elektron Ivano-Frankivsk (4)
1977    FC Elektron Ivano-Frankivsk (5)
1978    FC Khimik Kalush (13)
1979    FC Naftovyk Dolyna (2)
1980    FC Naftovyk Dolyna (3)
1981    FC Lokomotyv Ivano-Frankivsk
1982    FC Lokomotyv Ivano-Frankivsk (2)
1983    FC Naftovyk Dolyna (4)
1984    FC Naftovyk Dolyna (5)
1985    FC Elektron Ivano-Frankivsk (6)
1986    FC Kolos Holyn
1987    FC Kolos Holyn (2)
1988    FC Bystrytsia Nadvirna (3)
1989    FC Naftovyk Dolyna (6)
1990    FC Naftovyk Dolyna (7)
1991    FC Pokuttia Kolomyia
1992    FC Khutrovyk Tysmenytsia
1992-93 FC Limnytsia Perehinske
1993-94 FC Naftovyk Dolyna (8)
1994-95 FC Khimik Kalush (14)
1995-96 FC Avtolyvmas Ivano-Frankivsk
1996-97 FC Naftovyk Dolyna (9)
1997-98 FC Enerhetyk Burshtyn
1998-99 FC Probiy Horodenka
1999    FC Tekhno-Tsentr Rohatyn
2000    FC Korolivka
2001    FC Probiy Horodenka
2002    FC Teplovyk Ivano-Frankivsk
2003    FC Delta Hvizdets
2004    FC Delta Hvizdets (2)
2005    FC Delta Hvizdets (3)
2006    FC Tsementnyk Yamnytsia
2007    FC Karpaty Yaremche
2008    FC Karpaty Yaremche (2)
2009    FC Karpaty Yaremche (3)
2010    FC Karpaty Pechenizhyn
2011    FC Karpaty Kolomyia
2012    FC Karpaty Yaremche (4)
2013    FC Karpaty Kolomyia (2)
2014    FC Karpaty Broshniv
2015    FC Oskar Pidhirya
2016    FC Oskar Pidhirya (2)
2016-17 FC Karpaty Kolomyia (3)
2017-18 FC Halych
2018-19 FC Naftovyk Dolyna (10)

Note: In 1993-99 the championship was organized by fall-spring calendar. In 1999 the main competition was shifted back to the summer calendar. Therefore, there are two champions in 1999.

Winners
 13 - FC Kalush
 10 - FC Naftovyk Dolyna
 7 - FC Elektron Ivano-Frankivsk
 4 - 4 clubs (Spartak, Silmash K., Karpaty Ya., Karpaty (Pechenizhyn))
 3 - FC Bystrytsia Nadvirna (also Naftovyk)
 3 - FC Delta Hvizdets
 2 - 5 clubs
 1 - 14 clubs

Cup winners

1940    FC Dynamo Stanislav
1941-45 WWII
1946    FC Hvardiyets Stanislav
1947    FC Khimik Kalush
1948    FC Dynamo Stanislav
1949    FC Spartak Stanislav
1950    FC Dynamo Stanislav
1951    FC Iskra Stanislav
1952    FC Spartak Stanislav
1953    FC Spartak Stanislav 
1954    FC Spartak Stanislav
1955    FC Spartak Stanislav
1956    FC Khimik Kalush
1957    FC Khimik Kalush
1958    FC Khimik Kalush
1959    FC Khimik Kalush
1960    FC Khimik Kalush
1961    FC Khimik Kalush
1962    FC Naftovyk Dolyna
1963    FC Khimik Kalush
1964    FC Karpaty Broshniv
1965    FC Karpaty Broshniv
1966    FC Karpaty Kolomyia
1967    FC Avtomobilist Ivano-Frankivsk
1968    FC Naftovyk Dolyna
1969    FC Khimik Kalush
1970    FC Karpaty Kolomyia
1971    FC Khimik Kalush
1972    FC Khimik Kalush
1973    FC Elektron Ivano-Frankivsk
1974    FC Elektron Ivano-Frankivsk
1975    FC Khimik Kalush
1976    FC Elektron Ivano-Frankivsk
1977    FC Elektron Ivano-Frankivsk
1978    FC Elektron Ivano-Frankivsk
1979    FC Bystrytsia Nadvirna
1980    FC Naftovyk Dolyna
1981    FC Lokomotyv Ivano-Frankivsk
1982    FC Khimik Kalush
1983    FC Elektron Ivano-Frankivsk
1984    FC Mayak Pidhirya
1985    FC Silmash Kolomyia
1986    FC Kolos Holyn
1987    FC Bystrytsia Nadvirna
1988    FC Naftovyk Dolyna
1989    FC Naftovyk Dolyna
1990    FC Mashbud Ivano-Frankivsk
1991    FC Khimik Kalush
1992    no competition
1993    FC Pokuttia Kolomyia
1994    FC Beskyd Nadvirna
1995    FC Pokuttia Kolomyia
1996    FC Probiy Horodenka
1997    FC Enerhetyk Burshtyn
1998    FC Beskyd Nadvirna
1999    FC Korona Ivano-Frankivsk
2000    FC Korolivka
2001    FC Delta Hvizdets
2002    FC Delta Hvizdets
2003    FC Teplovyk Ivano-Frankivsk
2004    FC Teplovyk Ivano-Frankivsk
2005    FC Tuzhyliv
2006    FC Tsementnyk Yamnytsia
2007    FC Karpaty Yaremche
2008    FC Karpaty Yaremche
2009    FC Karpaty Yaremche
2010    FC Karpaty Yaremche
2011    FC Karpaty Kolomyia
2012    FC Karpaty Kolomyia
2013    FC Hazovyk Bohorodchany
2014

Professional clubs
 Stanislav city, 1946
 FC Spartak Ivano-Frankivsk (Prykarpattia Ivano-Frankivsk), 1956–2007
 
 FC Beskyd Nadvirna, 1993–1994 (single season)
 FC Khutrovyk Tysmenytsia, 1993–1998
 FC Kalush, 1995–2005, 2018–2020
 FC Pokuttia Kolomyia, 1996–1998 (two seasons)
 FC Naftovyk Dolyna, 1997–2008
 FC Enerhetyk Burshtyn, 1998–2012
 FC Tekhno-Tsentr Rohatyn, 2000–2005
 FC Prykarpattya Ivano-Frankivsk (Fakel Ivano-Frankivsk), 2004–2012
 FC Prykarpattia Ivano-Frankivsk (Teplovyk Ivano-Frankivsk), 2016–
 FC Karpaty Halych, 2020–2021

See also
 FFU Council of Regions

References

External links
 Official website
 List of Champions including the championship of the Polish Stanislawow District League.

Football in the regions of Ukraine
Football governing bodies in Ukraine
Sport in Ivano-Frankivsk Oblast